James Edward Taylor (born August 30, 1935) was a rear admiral in the United States Navy. He was Chief of the United States Naval Reserve from August 1989 until September 1992. He was succeeded by Thomas F. Hall.

Born and raised in Alabama, Taylor entered the United States Navy through the Naval Aviation Cadet Program. He completed flight training in 1957 and was commissioned as an ensign. Taylor later earned a Bachelor of Science degree from the Naval Postgraduate School and a master's degree in financial management from George Washington University.

Personal
Taylor's first marriage ended in divorce. He then married Amanda Nottingham Dillon on July 25, 1974 in Virginia Beach, Virginia.

References

1935 births
Living people
Military personnel from Alabama
United States Naval Aviators
Naval Postgraduate School alumni
United States Navy personnel of the Vietnam War
Recipients of the Air Medal
George Washington University alumni
Recipients of the Legion of Merit
United States Navy admirals